Partizán Bardejov Ženy was a women's football team representing Partizán Bardejov. The club has not entered any league for the 2021-2022 season due to financial problems.

Honours

Record in UEFA competitions

League and Cup history

Notes

References

  

Partizán Bardejov
Defunct women's football clubs in Slovakia
Association football clubs established in 2012
Association football clubs disestablished in 2021
2012 establishments in Slovakia
2021 disestablishments in Slovakia